Dadaga is a village in the southern state of Karnataka, India. It is located in the Nagamangala taluk of Mandya district in Karnataka. A lake and channel of Hemavathi water acts as water supply for irrigation conducted here. Many temples can also be found in this place. Government runs a primary and middle Kannada medium school in Dadaga which educates Dadaga and neighboring villages. Coconuts, mangoes, ragi, paddy (rice), wheat, corn, onions, tomatoes, are some of the plants that are cultivated here.

Demographics

Population
No of Households 192, Persons 843, Males 400, Females 443.

Religion
Hindus and Jains are the main natives lives here.

Cityscape

Channel
Hemavati river irrigation project's canal passes through Dadaga.

Flora

Lakes
Dadaga lake overflows into Dasinakera lake of Belluru.

Parks
A park used to exist here next to the lake few decades ago, but it's not present anymore.

Temples

Shantinath Tirthankar Basadi

Shantinath Tirthankar Basadi is one of the major attractions of Dadaga. Main Deity of this temple is a black coloured idol of Bhagawan Shanthinatha in the kayotsarga posture.
This temple of Bhagawan Shanthinatha was constructed in 1940.

See also
 Mandya
 Districts of Karnataka
 State of India

References

External links
 http://Mandya.nic.in/
 Census of India: http://www.censusindia.gov.in/PopulationFinder/Sub_Districts_Master.aspx?state_code=29&district_code=22
 Jainism in India: http://www.jainheritagecentres.com/karnataka/dadaga.htm

Villages in Mandya district